PMPC Star Awards for Movies is an annual award-giving body recognizing the outstanding films in the Philippines. It was operated by entertainment writers founded by the Philippine Movie Press Club in 1985. These are the award categories to be given away.

History
The first PMPC Star Awards for Movies was held in 1985.

Award ceremonies

Awards of Merit categories

Current categories

Discontinued categories

Special awards

Current special categories
Darling of the Press
Movie Loveteam of the Year
Nora Aunor Ulirang Artista Lifetime Achievement Award
Ulirang Alagad ng Pelikula sa Likod ng Kamera Lifetime Achievement Award

Most Wins

See also
 Star Awards for Television

References

External links

Lifetime achievement awards
Philippine film awards